Jess B. Weiss (Born 1917 Bronx, New York - died June 28, 2007 Fort Lauderdale, Florida) was an American anesthesiologist and medical doctor.

Weiss was best known for redesigning the shape of the epidural needle by adding a T-shaped set of wings.  This allowed anesthesiologists and physicians to more easily guide the needle into the spine of the patient.

External links and references
Boston Globe: Jess Weiss, 90; redesigned an epidural needle

References

American anesthesiologists
2007 deaths
People from the Bronx
1917 births
Date of birth missing
20th-century American physicians
Physicians from New York City